Liezel Huber and Lisa Raymond defeated Květa Peschke and Katarina Srebotnik in the final, 6–4, 6–4 to win the doubles tennis title at the 2011 WTA Tour Championships.

Gisela Dulko and Flavia Pennetta were the defending champions, but were defeated by Huber and Raymond in the semifinals.

Seeds

Draw

Finals

References
Draw

Doubles
WTA Tour Championships